This is a list of notable people from Tampa, Florida.

A
 Cannonball Adderley (1928–1975), saxophone player
 Nat Adderley (1931–2000), cornet player
 Doug Allen (born 1951), football player
 T.D. Allman (born 1944), writer, foreign correspondent, historian, author
 Geronimo Allison (born 1994), professional football player
 Aric Almirola (born 1984), stock car driver
 Pete Alonso (born 1994), professional baseball player
 Jose Alvarez (born 1956), professional baseball player
 Erin Andrews (born 1978), sports anchor 
 Gilbert Arenas (born 1982), professional basketball player
 Mike Awesome (1965–2007), professional wrestler

B
 Jeff Baisley (born 1982), professional baseball player
 George F. Baughman (1915–2004), first president of New College of Florida, rear admiral, USNR 
 Derek Bell (born 1968), professional baseball player
 Butch Benton (born 1957), professional baseball player
 Dan Bilzerian (born 1980), professional poker player, personality
 Sheila Bleck (born 1974), professional bodybuilder
 Salha "Mama" Bobo (c. 1900–2001), Ybor business pioneer
 William Brennan (born 1963), professional baseball player
 Evelyn Brent (1899–1975), actress
 Corey Brown (born 1985), professional baseball player
 Bob Buckhorn, politician
 Mike Bynum (born 1978), professional baseball player

C
 CADE (born 1996), singer/songwriter, musician
Cody Carson (born 1989), singer
 Aaron Carter (1987–2022), actor/singer
 Jeff Carter (born 1964), professional baseball player
 Leslie Carter (1986–2012), singer 
 Nick Carter (born 1980), singer of the Backstreet Boys
 Rick Casares (1931–2013), professional football player
 Kevin Cash (born 1977), professional baseball player
 Celph Titled, rapper, record producer
 John Cena (born 1977), professional wrestler, actor, rapper, television presenter
 Ray Charles (1930–2004), blind blues and pops singer, pianist
 Jordan Clarkson (born 1992), professional basketball player for the Utah Jazz
 Barry Cohen (attorney) (1939–2018), criminal defense attorney 
 Nardi Contreras (born 1951), professional baseball player
 Ron Crawford (born 1945), actor and artist
 Tim Crews (1961–1993), professional baseball
Cr1TiKaL(born 1994), YouTuber, streamer, musician
Matthew Cox (born 1969), former mortgage broker and fraudster. Most Wanted by Secret Service in 2006.

D
 Helen Davis (1926–2015), Florida state legislator
 Jules Dervaes (1947–2016), urban farmer and environmentalist
 Nancy Davis (born c. 1977), American investor, businessperson
 Toney Douglas (born 1986), basketball player for Hapoel Eilat of the Israeli Basketball Premier League
 Cory Doyne (born 1981), professional baseball player
 Sam Dyson (born 1988), professional baseball player
 Ryan Davis (born 1989), professional football player

E
 Marco Antonio Escobar (born 1982), YouTube personality, actor, camera operator, film editor, businessman
 Carl Everett (born 1971), professional baseball player

F
 Lenny Faedo (born 1960), professional baseball player
 David Fagen (1870– date of death unknown), Buffalo Soldier, anti-imperialist
 Ernest Ferlita (1927–2015), Jesuit priest and playwright
 Mike Figga (born 1970), professional baseball player

G
 Leo Gallagher (born 1947), better known as Gallagher, watermelon-smashing comedian
 Robert Gant (born 1968), actor
 Joanna Garcia (born 1979), actress
 Steve Garvey (born 1948), professional baseball player
 Walter Lee Gibbons (1928–2015), pitcher in Negro league baseball and the Minor Leagues
 Mychal Givens (born 1990), MLB pitcher
 Graham Godfrey (born 1984), professional baseball player
 Luis Gonzalez (born 1967), professional baseball player
 Dwight Gooden (born 1964), professional baseball player
  Arjun Gupta (born 1986), actor

H
 Bob Hall (born 1942), member of Texas State Senate
 Denny Hamlin (born 1980), professional stock car driver
 Garry Hancock (1954–2015), professional baseball player
 Rondo Hatton (1894–1946), actor/reporter
 Eric Hayes (born 1967), football player
 Mike Heath (born 1955), professional baseball player
 Jaclyn Hill (born 1990), American entrepreneur and internet personality
 Hulk Hogan (born 1953), actor/wrestler
 Melissa Howard (born 1977), actress/comedian
 Rodney Howard-Brown, Christian evangelist and pastor of River Church
 John Hudek (born 1966), professional baseball player
 Gary Huff (born 1951), professional football player
 Lauren Hutton (born 1943), supermodel, actress

I
 Paul D. Irving (born 1957), Sergeant at Arms of the United States House of Representatives

J
 Rick Jacobson, The grouper king of Tampa
 Carter Jenkins (born 1991), actor
 Matt Joyce (born 1984), professional baseball player

K
 Kamelot (formed 1991), power metal band
 Jill Kelley (born 1975), philanthropist and advocate
 Tarence Kinsey (born 1984), basketball player for Hapoel Jerusalem of the Israeli Premier League
 KJ-52 (born 1975), Christian rapper
 Ryszard Kukliński, Polish soldier and CIA agent
 Joseph Kittinger, former United States Air Force officer
 Bert Kreischer, comedian

L
 Tony LaRussa (born 1944), professional baseball player
 Tony Little  (born 1956), fitness equipment pitchman
 Al López (1908–2005), professional baseball player
 Vance Lovelace (born 1963), professional baseball player
 Sumter de Leon Lowry Jr. (1893–1985), businessman, civic leader, National Guard commander and segregationist political figure

M
 Dave Magadan (born 1962), professional baseball player
 Matt Mantei (born 1973), professional baseball player
 Sam Marsonek (born 1978), professional baseball player
 Andrew Martin (1975–2009), Canadian professional wrestler, died in Tampa
 Robert Martinez (born 1934), politician, former Governor of Florida
 Tino Martinez (born 1967), professional baseball player
 Billy Mays (1958–2009), TV commercial pitchman
 Eugene McCaslin (born 1977), professional football player
 Lance McCullers (born 1964), professional baseball player
 Tom McEwen (1923–2011), sportswriter
 Fred McGriff (born 1963), professional baseball player
 Butterfly McQueen (1911–1995), actress, Gone with the Wind
 Peter Mellor (born 1947), English-born American soccer player and coach
 Jason Michaels (born 1976), professional baseball player
 Sam Militello (born 1969), professional baseball player
 Rich Monteleone (born 1963), professional baseball player
 Aaron Murray, professional football player

N
 Gene Nelson (born 1960), professional baseball player
 Andrew R. Nicholas (born 1989), historian and author
 Leslie Nicholas Jr. (1927–2007), businessman

O

 Ralph Onis (1908–1995), professional baseball player

P
 VoiceoverPete (Pete Accetturo) (born 1959), Internet personality
 Ferdie Pacheco (1927–2017), physician, boxing analyst
 Sarah Paulson (born 1974), Emmy Award-winning actress
 Lou Piniella (born 1943), professional baseball player
 Peter Polansky, tennis player
 Rich Puig (born 1953), professional baseball player

R
 Ryan Raburn (born 1981), professional baseball player
 John Ramos (born 1965), professional baseball player
 Chris Ray (born 1982), professional baseball player
 John Reaves (1950–2017), professional football player
 Jody Reed (born 1962), professional baseball player
 Roy Roberts (1906–1975), actor
 Shane Robinson (born 1984), professional baseball player
 Todd Rogers (born 1964), electronic sports player
 Jason Romano (born 1979), professional baseball player
 Calvin Royal III, ballet dancer

S
 Tony Samuels (1954–2001), gridiron football player
 David Sanborn (born 1945), musician (saxophonist)
 Stephanie Moulton Sarkis (born 1974), psychotherapist and author
 Randy Savage (1952–2011), professional wrestler
 Lauren Kaye Scott, known as Dakota Skye (actress) (1994–2021), pornographic actress
 Gary Sheffield (born 1968), professional baseball player
 Amber Smith (born 1971), actress and model
 Brittany Snow (born 1986), actress
 Matthew Stafford (born 1988), professional football player
 George Steinbrenner (1930–2010), philanthropist, principal owner of New York Yankees
 Stephen Stills (born 1945), singer/songwriter, musician
 Steve Swindal, businessman, chairman of the Port Tampa Bay
 John H. Sykes, businessman and philanthropist, founder of Sykes Enterprises

T
 Channing Tatum (born 1980), actor
 Owen Teague (born 1998), actor
 Ernest Ivy Thomas Jr. (1924–1945), Marine, one of six who raised first flag on Mount Suribachi at Battle of Iwo Jima
 Randolph W. Thrower (1913–2014), former Commissioner of the Internal Revenue Service
 Mel Tillis (1932–2017), country-western singer-songwriter and musician; Country Music Entertainer of the Year in 1976
 Santo Trafficante Jr. (1914–1987), Mafia boss
 Kyle Tucker (born 1997), Major League Baseball (MLB) player
 Preston Tucker (born 1990), MLB player

V

 David E. Vogt III, politician

W
Charles White Jr. (Cr1TiKaL) (born 1994), YouTuber, streamer, actor, voice actor, podcast host, musician, businessman and writer
 Dreama Walker (born 1986), actress
 Sharon Webb (1936–2010), science fiction writer
 Dan White (actor) (March 25, 1908–July 7, 1980), American actor in vaudeville, theater, film and television
 John White (born 1935), football player
 Slim Whitman (1923–2013), country music and western music singer
 Mike Williams (born 1984), professional football player
 Charles R. Wilson (born 1954), federal judge
 Ted Washington (born 1968), professional football player

Z
 Tony Zappone (born 1947), journalist, broadcaster, author

Tampa, Florida
Tampa
People